Neil Sang (born 23 May 1972) is an English former professional footballer who played in the Football League for Torquay United. He went on to work as a football agent and currently represents Tom Davies who plays for Everton F.C.  His son Tom is a footballer at Championship club Cardiff City

Footballer
Sang began his career as a trainee with Everton. He also played in Leagues One and Two for Torquay United, for Caernarfon Town and then signed for Bangor City in the 1997 close season where he played under former Everton legend Graeme Sharp. Sharp mentions this fact in his Autobiography (page 255)...."I also brought a player called Neil Sang to the club. Sangy had been a young reserve during my latter years at Everton, but he hadn't managed to break into the first team, which was a bit of a surprise because he had all the attributes to be a class footballer"

In 1998, he was playing alongside Lee Trundle for Chorley, while by December 1998 he was playing for Marine. He also had spells at Conference clubs Macclesfield Town and Morecambe FC.

Licensed Agent
At 26 he became the youngest FIFA-licensed football agent in the world at the time when he acquired his licence in 1999. Clients include Danny Cadamarteri, Geremi, Kevin McLeod, Richie Partridge, Lee Trundle and Mark Wilson.

In 1999, he set up a company, Sportstar Promotions, based in Speke, which he is managing director of.

In 2005, Sang negotiated what was believed to be the first image rights deal outside the Premier League, when Lee Trundle signed an agreement with Swansea City, then of Football League One.

Radio pundit

Sang regularly offers his views on football and transfer dealings on Terrace Talk which is a weekly Saturday afternoon radio show hosted by Phil Cooper, Liverpool legend Ian St John and former Everton legend Ian Snodin. The show is aired on Liverpool's Radio City 96.7 FM.

He also has his own show in conjunction with Bury FC player, Ryan Lowe. The show is called Extra Time and is aired "live" on a Monday evening between 5pm and 6:30pm on City Talk 1548 MW.

References

Living people
1972 births
English footballers
Everton F.C. players
Torquay United F.C. players
Runcorn F.C. Halton players
Caernarfon Town F.C. players
Bangor City F.C. players
Chorley F.C. players
Marine F.C. players
British sports agents
Footballers from Liverpool
Macclesfield Town F.C. players
Association football midfielders